Dean Clarke (born 28 July 1977 in Hereford) is a former footballer who started his career for Hereford United, before moving on to Cheltenham town, Merthyr Town, Newport county, Bath city. He went on to make over 500 southern league appearances and gaining 4 promotions. 

Dean started his career at Hereford United as a YTS player making his debut on the last day of the 1993–94 season against Doncaster Rovers.

On 30 January 2021, Clarke was appointed as manager of Southern Football League club Merthyr Town. On the 13th February 2022 Merthyr Town parted ways with Clarke, with the club languishing in the relegation zone of the Southern Premier League South Division.

References

1977 births
Living people
English footballers
Hereford United F.C. players
Cheltenham Town F.C. players
Merthyr Tydfil F.C. players
Newport County A.F.C. players
Bath City F.C. players
Barry Town United F.C. players
English Football League players
Westfields F.C. players
Merthyr Town F.C. players
Merthyr Town F.C. managers
Association football midfielders